Vladimir Ivanovich Zabrezhnev (March 28, 1877, Petersburg – March 9, 1939, Leningrad) was a Russian revolutionary, criminologist and NKVD officer.

Essays
 "On Terror", in the book: "Russian Revolution and Anarchism. Papers read at the Congress of Communists-Anarchists in October 1906 ”, London, 1907;
"Preachers of Individualist Anarchism in Russia (Report to the Amsterdam Congress of Anarchist Communists, held on August 24–31, 1907)", "Burevestnik", Paris, 1908, No. 10-11;
"On individualistic anarchism." London. 1912.
“The first years of my party work (1895–1899)”, “Proletarian Revolution”, 1923, no. 10;
"Butyrki 1905 and the first successful escape from them." "Hard labor and exile", 1925, No. 4;
"Behind the Mass", in the book: "December 1905 at Krasnaya Presnya", 3rd ed., M., 1925.
"Theory and Practice of Mental Impact", 1922.
"Controversial Issues of Hypnology", 1925.
"Problems of Modern Hypnology", 1926.

1877 births
1939 deaths
Directors of the Hermitage Museum
Russian Social Democratic Labour Party members
Russian anarchists
Anarcho-communists
Escapees from Russian detention
Russian revolutionaries
Writers from the Russian Empire